Ibón Larrazábal Landa (born 22 January 1980 in Mungia, Biscay) is a Spanish retired footballer who played as a defensive midfielder.

External links

1980 births
Living people
People from Mungialdea
Spanish footballers
Footballers from the Basque Country (autonomous community)
Association football midfielders
Segunda División players
Segunda División B players
Tercera División players
CA Osasuna B players
CA Osasuna players
Real Unión footballers
Sestao River footballers
SD Eibar footballers
Sportspeople from Biscay